The 2015 FIA World Rallycross Championship presented by Monster Energy was the second season of the FIA World Rallycross Championship. The season consisted of thirteen rounds and started on 25 April with the Portuguese round at Montalegre. The season ended on 29 November, at Rosario, Santa Fe in Argentina.

Calendar
On 20 February 2015 it was announced that the series would support the opening round of the 2015 Deutsche Tourenwagen Masters season, at Hockenheim.

Teams and drivers

Championship Standings

FIA World Rallycross Championship for Drivers

FIA World Rallycross Championship for Teams

References

External links

 
World Rallycross Championship seasons
World Rallycross Championship